Hrvoje Sep (born 26 February 1986) is a Croatian professional boxer.

Amateur career
He was boxing for BK Leonardo under Leonardo Pjetraj.

Sep was 6 times champion of Croatia (2008, 2009, 2010, 2013, 2014, 2016), two times runner-up (2012, 2015).

He was also WSB Season I Champion (As member of Paris United team) and two times (Season III and season V) as member of Astana Arlans team, with a 22-8 record.

He competed in the light heavyweight event at the 2016 Summer Olympics, defeating Abdelrahman Salah in 1st round while losing to hometown Michel Borges in 2nd.

Olympic Games results 
At the 2016 Summer Olympics in Rio de Janeiro, boxing as a Light Heavyweight (81 kg):
Round 1/32 - Defeated Abdelrahman Salah (Egypt) 2-1
Round 1/16 - Lost to Michel Borges (Brazil) 0-3

World Amateur Championships results 
At the 2009 AIBA World Boxing Championships in Milan, Italy, boxing as a Light Heavyweight (81 kg):
Round 1/64 - Defeated Siarhei Karneyeu (Ukraine) 16-0
Round 1/32 - Lost to Jeysson Monroy Varela (Colombia) 8-16

At the 2011 AIBA World Boxing Championships in Baku, Azerbaijan, boxing as a Light Heavyweight (81 kg):
1st round bye
Round 1/32 - Lost to Džemal Bošnjak (Bosnia and Herzegovina) 8-17

At the 2013 AIBA World Boxing Championships in Almaty, Kazakhstan, boxing as a Light Heavyweight (81 kg):
1st round bye
Round 1/32 - Lost to Ali Ghoussoun (Syria) 1-2

At the 2015 AIBA World Boxing Championships in Doha, Qatar, boxing as a Light Heavyweight (81 kg):
Round 1/32 - Defeated Juan Carlos Carrillo (Colombia) 3-0
Round 1/16 - Defeated Aaron Spagnolo (Australia) 3-0
Quarterfinals - Lost to Julio César la Cruz (Cuba) 0-3

Professional boxing record

References

External links
 
 
 
 
 

1986 births
Living people
Croatian male boxers
Olympic boxers of Croatia
Boxers at the 2016 Summer Olympics
Sportspeople from Vinkovci
Light-heavyweight boxers